The Jucklins is a lost 1921 American silent drama film directed by George Melford and written by Frank Condon, based on the novel The Jucklins by Opie Read. The film stars Winter Hall, Mabel Julienne Scott, Monte Blue, Ruth Renick, Fanny Midgley, Z. Wall Covington, and J.M. Dumont. The film was released on January 9, 1921, by Paramount Pictures.

Cast 
Winter Hall as General Lundsford
Mabel Julienne Scott as Guinea Jucklin
Monte Blue as Bill Hawes
Ruth Renick as Millie Lundsford
Fanny Midgley as Susan Jucklin 
Z. Wall Covington as Alf Jucklin 
J.M. Dumont as Chyd Lundsford
Clarence Burton as Dr. Etheridge
Guy Oliver as Sheriff Parker
Robert Brower as Attorney Conkwright
Jack Herbert as Scott Aimes
Jack Hull as Bill Aimes
Walter F. Scott as Jim Aimes
Frank Weatherwax as Johnny Aimes
William Boyd as Dan Stuart
Charles Stanton Ogle as Lim Judklin
Jack Byron

References

External links 

 
 

1921 films
1921 lost films
Silent American drama films
1921 drama films
Paramount Pictures films
Films directed by George Melford
Films based on American novels
American black-and-white films
Lost American films
American silent feature films
Lost drama films
1920s American films